Re Parkes Garage (Swadlincote) Ltd [1929] 1 Ch 139 is a leading UK insolvency law case, concerning a voidable floating charge for past value.

Facts
The liquidator of Parkes Garage (Swadlincote) Ltd sought a declaration that a floating charge on the company's property given by a debenture to a creditor, Mr Oswald Ling, was invalid. Parkes Garage Ltd, a garage proprietor and motor dealer, went insolvent in March 1927 (though this only transpired during litigation). On 15 June it executed a floating charge for a group of creditors (the trustee acting for the group was an accountant named Mr Oswald Ling). On 27 July the company sold part of the business and used that cash to pay off the group of creditors, with interest and a fee to Mr Ling. They endorsed a memorandum of discharge on the debenture. On 14 September, another creditor, Midland Bank, heard about these dealings and successfully petitioned for a winding up order. The liquidator alleged that under section 212 of the Companies (Consolidation) Act 1908 (now Insolvency Act 1986 section 245) the debenture for Ling was invalid because it was conferred more value than it was worth in the three months before insolvency.

The County Court judge held that the payment of the debts to the group of creditors was invalid. Mr Ling appealed.

Judgment
Eve J held that it was not open to the judge to declare the debenture as a whole invalid, so that no debt would be repaid at all. He was only allowed to declare the charge invalid, because that is all that Companies (Consolidation) Act 1908, section 212 (now Insolvency Act 1986, section 245) affected. The charge could not be merged with the debt itself. Nevertheless, it might well be argued yet that the whole transaction was invalid as a fraudulent preference, but that was not done here.

Maugham J concurred.

See also

UK insolvency law

Notes

References

United Kingdom insolvency case law
High Court of Justice cases
1929 in case law
1929 in British law
Swadlincote